Acraea translucida, the translucent acraea, is a butterfly in the family Nymphalidae. It is found in Ghana, Togo, Nigeria, Cameroon and possibly Ivory Coast and Benin.

Description
Very close to Acraea penelope q.v.

Biology
The habitat consists of forests.

Adult males mud-puddle and both sexes are attracted to flowers, especially those of Eupatorium odorata.

Taxonomy
It is a member of the Acraea circeis species group - but see also Pierre & Bernaud, 2014

References

Butterflies described in 1912
translucida